opened near the confluence of the Kamo and Takano Rivers in Kyoto, Japan, in 1977. The collection, based on that built up by businessman , comprises some 1,000 works including thirty-three Important Cultural Properties and nine Important Art Objects, with a particular focus on tea utensils. There is also a tea garden, a Registered Cultural Property. The Museum opens to the public for exhibitions each autumn and spring.

Important Cultural Properties
Among the Museum's thirty-three Important Cultural Properties are the pair of scrolls Kite and Crows by Yosa Buson, Fujiwara no Nakafumi, from the series Thirty-Six Poetry Immortals formerly in the Satake Collection, and the Spring 1227 (Karoku 3) portion of Fujiwara no Teika's .

See also
 Kyoto National Museum
 Kyoto Imperial Palace
 Bokuseki

References

External links
  Kitamura Museum

Museums in Kyoto
Museums established in 1977
1977 establishments in Japan